JNJ-5207852 is a histamine antagonist selective for the H3 subtype. It has stimulant and nootropic effects in animal studies, and has been suggested as a possible treatment for some memory defects associated with epilepsy. JNJ-5207852 itself did not progress to clinical development due to poor pharmacokinetic characteristics, but the related compound JNJ-17216498 was in a Phase II clinical trial for the treatment of narcolepsy in 2007.

References

H3 receptor antagonists
Johnson & Johnson brands
Phenol ethers
1-Piperidinyl compounds